Paul Brainerd (born 1947) is an American businessman, computer programmer and philanthropist. In 1984, he co-founded the Aldus Corporation, which released Pagemaker, the first consumer-use desktop publishing software. Brainerd has since coined the term "desktop publishing". Since 1995, he has been involved in philanthropic efforts, including the founding of Social Ventures Partners in 1997, a global organization that connects local investors with non-profit community organizations.

Life
Brainerd was born in Medford, Oregon, to Phil and VerNatta Brainerd. He attended the University of Oregon, where he received his BA in business administration, followed by an M.S. in journalism from the University of Minnesota. He was the editor for the school's paper, the Oregon Daily Emerald. Following graduation, he worked at the Minneapolis Star-Tribune.

Desktop publishing
Brainerd co-founded the publishing/printing software company Aldus in 1984. The company subsequently brought PageMaker to the market. Brainerd is also known for having coined the term "desktop publishing". He stepped down from his position of president and chief executive of Aldus in 1993, ten years after its founding.

Philanthropy
In 1995, Brainerd founded the Brainerd Foundation, a small family foundation that provides innovative grantmaking to Pacific Northwest communities and nonprofits to build a lasting conservation ethic at the local, state, and federal level.

Brainerd founded Social Ventures Partners (SVP) in 1997. The organization works by matching philanthropists, who provide funding and mentorship, with local community organizations. By 2017, the organization consisted of 3,500 venture philanthropists in 43 cities and nine countries. The group's collective investments total more than $63 million in over 800 organizations.

In 2000, Paul Brainerd founded Islandwood, an environmental learning center created to improve access to meaningful, nature-based learning experiences for the region's children. The center is located on Bainbridge Island, Washington.

In 2018, Brainerd founded Camp Glenorchy, an accommodation provider that operates in Glenorchy, New Zealand. Camp Glenorchy is designed, built, engineered and operated in line with the philosophy and principles of the Living Building Challenge, a sustainability standard for buildings. The establishment of the camp was controversial with the local community.

References

Sources 
HistoryLink Essay: Paul Brainerd
Brainerd Foundation

Philanthropists from Oregon
American computer programmers
University of Oregon alumni
People from Medford, Oregon
Living people
1947 births